Hippeastrum pardinum is a flowering perennial herbaceous bulbous plant, in the family Amaryllidaceae, from Peru to Bolivia. Originally collected in 1866 by Richard Pearce, it was used in breeding programmes.

Description
Vermilion spots on a yellowish background, resembling a leopard skin. Short or nearly absent flower tube, floral segments broad, recurved and spreading. Flowers 18 cm in diameter.

Taxonomy 
Described by Joseph Dalton Hooker in 1867 as Amaryllis, but transferred to Hippeastrum by Henry Honywood Dombrain.

Images

References

Sources 
 
 GBIF: Hippeastrum pardinum
 
 International Bulb Society: Hippeastrum pardinum (image)
 Brako, L. & J. L. Zarucchi. 1993. Catalogue of the Flowering Plants and Gymnosperms of Peru. Monogr. Syst. Bot. Missouri Bot. Gard. 45: i–xl, 1–1286.
 Macbride, J. F. 1936. Amaryllidaceae, Flora of Peru. Publ. Field Mus. Nat. Hist., Bot. Ser. 13(1/3): 631–690.
 L'Illustration Horticole. Ghent & Brussels 14:(Misc.) 46.  1867

Flora of South America
pardinum
Garden plants of South America